Entimus imperialis, common name Brazilian diamond beetle, is a species of broad-nosed weevils belonging to the family true weevil and the Entiminae subfamily.

Description
The basic colour is black. Elytra are strongly convex and laterally compressed, punctured with longitudinal rows of golden-green dots, filled with scales composed by crystals of chitin and resembling little diamonds (hence the common name). Diamond beetles are also used for ladies' jewelry.

The scales of Entimus imperialis appears iridescent (i.e., exhibit colour changes with viewing angle) because of the presence of three-dimensional photonic crystals.
 This characteristics is probably used as a camouflage and to facilitate intersexual recognition.

Distribution
This species can be found in southwest Brazil as an endemic species.

References

 Universal biological Indexer
 Wired.com
 Virtual-beetles

External links
 Entimus imperialis on Flickr

Beetles described in 1771
imperialis
Taxa named by Johann Reinhold Forster